The William Penn Senior High School is a large, urban, public high school serving the City of York, Pennsylvania in York County, Pennsylvania. There were 876 pupils enrolled in 2014. It is the sole high school operated by the School District of the City of York. Among grades 9–12, 87.6% of pupils were eligible for a free lunch due to family poverty, as of 2014.

Extracurriculars
William Penn Senior High School students have access to a wide variety of clubs, activities and an extensive sports program.

Varsity sports
The district provides:

Boys
Basketball – AAAA
Football – AAAA
Indoor track and field – AA
Swimming and diving – AAA
Track and field – AAA

Girls
Basketball – AAAA
Cheerleading – AAAA
Indoor track and field – AAAA
Swimming and diving – AAA
Track and field – AAA
Volleyball – AAA

—according to PIAA directory, June 2015

Notable alumni
 Bruce Arians, head coach of the Tampa Bay Buccaneers
 Will Beatty, NFL offensive lineman
 Haps Benfer, former college football, basketball, and baseball head coach
 Kim Bracey, former mayor of York
 Omar Brown, former NFL Defensive Back
 Phyliss Carr, Jeannie Crist, Roberta Haymon, Carolyn "Sissie" Holmes, Kenny Sexton, original members of The Quin-Tones doo wop group
 Chris Doleman, Pro Football Hall of Fame defensive end
 Carol Hill-Evans, politician
 Mike Hawthorne, comic book artist
 Ed Kowalczyk, Chad Taylor, Patrick Dahlheimer, and Chad Gracey, members of the rock band Live
 Charlie Robertson, former mayor of York
 Tim Warfield, jazz musician

References

York, Pennsylvania
Schools in York County, Pennsylvania
Susquehanna Valley
Public high schools in Pennsylvania
High schools in Central Pennsylvania